The Great Terror  may refer to:
The Reign of Terror (1793–1794), a period of extreme violence during the French Revolution, the last weeks of which are sometimes referred to as the Red Terror or Great Terror
The Great Purge (1936–1938), a campaign of political repression in the Soviet Union
The Great Terror (book), a 1968 book about the Great Purge